Parthenius I of Constantinople, (? – 8 September 1646) was the Patriarch of the Church of Constantinople from 1639 to 1644. Parthenius was patriarch during a period of frequent changes of the occupant of the cathedra of Constantinople under the Ottoman Sultan. He only served one period.

Dispute with Nicephorus
In a dispute with Patriarch Nicephorus of Alexandria, Parthenius sided with the hierarchs of the Church of Sinai by granting them permission to perform religious services in Cairo when Nicephorus was visiting Moldovlachia. After Nicephorus was back in Alexandria, his protests made Parthenius revoke his permission. Still, the tensions over this issue continued between the two Churches.

Synods
In the year 1641, Parthenius summoned a synod at Constantinople, at which eight prelates and four dignitaries of the church were present. In this synod, the term Transubstantiation is said to have been authorised. In the next year, Parthenius organized the more important Synod of Iași. The purpose of this assembly was to counter certain Catholic and Protestant doctrinal errors which had infiltrated Orthodox theology and to offer a comprehensive Orthodox statement on the truth of faith.

References

Sources

17th-century Ecumenical Patriarchs of Constantinople
17th-century Greek clergy
People from Ioannina
Metropolitans of Anchialos
Bishops of Adrianople
1646 deaths